Wilmington High School (or WHS) is a public four-year high school located in Wilmington, a southwest suburb of Chicago of the United States, in Will County. It is operated by Wilmington School District 209-U.

Notable alumni
 Damien Anderson, NFL and CFL running back, Class of 1997
 Kiiara, singer, Class of 2013
 Tanner Roark, MLB pitcher, Class of 2005

References

External links
Wilmington High School official site

Public high schools in Illinois
Schools in Will County, Illinois